The 2011–12 season is the 20th season of the Macedonian Handball Super League.

Teams

Regular season

Standings

1Borec were deducted two points for not playing against Kumanovo and Metalurg Junior
2Prespa 2010 were deducted one point for not playing against Pelister

Pld - Played; W - Won; L - Lost; PF - Points for; PA - Points against; Diff - Difference; Pts - Points.

Results
In the table below the home teams are listed on the left and the away teams along the top.

*match awarded

Play-off

Standings

Pld - Played; W - Won; L - Lost; PF - Points for; PA - Points against; Diff - Difference; Pts - Points.

Results
In the table below the home teams are listed on the left and the away teams along the top.

1played in Skopje

Play-out

Standings

1Borec were deducted one point for not playing against Metalurg Junior in the regular season

Pld - Played; W - Won; L - Lost; PF - Points for; PA - Points against; Diff - Difference; Pts - Points.

Results
In the table below the home teams are listed on the left and the away teams along the top.

External links

 Scoresway 

Handball competitions in North Macedonia
Hand
Hand
2011–12 domestic handball leagues